Sara Cambensy is an American politician who served in the Michigan House of Representatives, representing the 109th District and is a member of the Democratic Party. Prior to her election to the state legislature, Cambensy served on the Marquette City Commission, Marquette Planning Commission and was the director of adult and continuing education for Marquette Community Schools.

Biography
Campbensy is a lifelong resident of Marquette, in Michigan's Upper Peninsula. She has two degrees from Northern Michigan University, a bachelor's degree in education earned in 2002 and a master's degree in public administration in 2011.

Political career
In April 2017, Cambensy announced her campaign to seek the Democratic nomination in the 109th District in the Michigan House of Representatives, to succeed three-term state Rep. John Kivela, who was term-limited and was running for state Senate.

The 109th district seat became vacant on May 9, 2017, when Kivela committed suicide just hours after his second drunken driving arrest during his five years in the House. On May 18, 2017, Gov. Rick Snyder announced a special election to fill the remainder of Kivela's term, with a special primary election on August 8, 2017, and the special general election on November 7, 2017. On May 23, 2017,announced that she would run in the special election as well. Cambensy won the Democratic on August 8, 2017, taking 36 percent of the vote, winning by just 133 votes in a four-person field. On November 7, 2017, she won the special general election to finish the last 14 months of Kivela's term, defeating Republican nominee Rich Rossway and Green Party candidate Wade Roberts, receiving 57 percent of the vote. She was sworn in on November 28, 2017 She served in the state House until she was term limited in 2022.

Electoral history

See also 
 2018 Michigan House of Representatives election

References

External links
 State Rep. Sara Cambensy
 Sara Cambensy for state Representative

Year of birth missing (living people)
Living people
21st-century American politicians
Women state legislators in Michigan
Democratic Party members of the Michigan House of Representatives
People from Marquette, Michigan
21st-century American women politicians